Fabio Lupo (born 11 October 1964) is an Italian football director and former midfielder.

He is currently working with  club SPAL as their sporting director.

Playing career
Lupo's playing career started at Francavilla. In 1984 he joined Campobasso, with whom he made his Serie B debut. He successively moved to Bari, where he won promotion to Serie A and later made his top flight debut.

In 1991, Lupo joined Ancona, being part of the squad that won a historical first ever promotion to Serie A in the club's history.

Managerial career
After retirement, Lupo took on a career as a football director. His main roles were at Torino from 2007 to 2009, Palermo from 2017 to 2018, Venezia from 2019 to 2020. He was successively hired by SPAL in 2022.

References

1964 births
Living people
Italian footballers
A.S.D. Francavilla players
A.C. Cesena players
S.S.D. Città di Campobasso players
S.S.C. Bari players
A.C. Ancona players
U.S. Avellino 1912 players
S.S. Teramo Calcio players
Association football midfielders
Serie A players